Sarah Elizabeth Fitz-Gerald AM (born 1 December 1968) is an Australian women's squash player who won five World Open titles – 1996, 1997, 1998, 2001 and 2002. She ranks alongside Janet Morgan, Nicol David, Susan Devoy, Michelle Martin and Heather McKay as the sport's greatest female players of all time.

Career
Fitz-Gerald was born in Melbourne, Australia, a hotspot for squash talent. In 1987, she won the female World Junior Championship and was the Australian Junior Female Athlete of the Year. It was also during this year that she represented Australia at the 1987 Women's World Team Squash Championships finishing runner-up to England. In 1992 she was selected once again to represent Australia in the 1992 Women's World Team Squash Championships and this time Australia became the world champions. Remarkably Fitzgerald would go on to win a total of seven World Team Championships.

She won numerous titles in the early 1990s, but 1996 proved to be her breakthrough year. She beat England's Cassie Jackman in the World Open Final. The next two years she beat the resurgent Michelle Martin in successive finals.

The next two years did not bring the same level of success, owing largely to knee surgery. In 2000, she lost an epic semi-final against Carol Owens. However, she came back in 2001 to beat New Zealand's Leilani Joyce emphatically 9–0, 9–3, 9–2.

2002 saw her win her last World Open, beating Natalie Pohrer 10–8, 9–3, 7–9, 9–7. She also won a gold medal at the 2002 Commonwealth Games in Manchester, England.

In January 2004, Fitz-Gerald was awarded the Member of the Order of Australia (AM) for her achievements and services to women's squash, and the promotion of sport and a healthy lifestyle. She was Chairwoman and President of the Women's International Squash Players Association from 1991 to 2002. In 2010, she was inducted into the Sport Australia Hall of Fame.

In 2010, she came out of retirement to be part of the Australian team that won the gold medal at the 2010 Women's World Team Squash Championships.

In 2018, she won her fourth World Masters title.

Career statistics

Professional Tour Titles (60)
All Results for Sarah Fitzgerald in WISPA World's Tour tournament

See also
 List of WISPA number 1 ranked players
 Official Women's Squash World Ranking

References

External links
 Official website

1968 births
Living people
Australian female squash players
Commonwealth Games gold medallists for Australia
Commonwealth Games silver medallists for Australia
Commonwealth Games bronze medallists for Australia
Commonwealth Games medallists in squash
Squash players at the 1998 Commonwealth Games
Squash players at the 2002 Commonwealth Games
World Games gold medalists
Competitors at the 1997 World Games
Members of the Order of Australia
Sport Australia Hall of Fame inductees
People educated at MacGregor State High School
Sportspeople from Melbourne
Sportswomen from Victoria (Australia)
People educated at Star of the Sea College, Melbourne
Medallists at the 1998 Commonwealth Games
Medallists at the 2002 Commonwealth Games